The 2007 Ole Miss Rebels football team represented the University of Mississippi during the 2007 NCAA Division I FBS football season. This was Ed Orgeron's third and final season as head coach of the football team.

Previous season
In 2006, Ole Miss finished with a 4–8 record and finished second to last in the SEC West. Ole Miss's only conference wins came against Vanderbilt and Mississippi State, and they suffered blowout losses against the likes of Missouri, Arkansas, Kentucky and Wake Forest. The Rebels did not qualify for a bowl game, but they hoped to improve in 2007.

Schedule
Ole Miss opened the season against non-conference and longtime rival Memphis and played their home opener against Big 12 opponent Missouri. Ole Miss travelled to Vanderbilt, Georgia, Arkansas and Mississippi State. The Rebels hosted SEC opponents Florida, Alabama, Arkansas and LSU. The Rebels also played host to Northwestern State and hosted Louisiana Tech for their homecoming game.

Schedule Source:

References

Ole Miss
Ole Miss Rebels football seasons
Ole Miss Rebels football